Heatherton Village (or Heatherton) is a modern residential housing development in Derby, England, located at the southern end of the older suburb of Littleover, and approximately  south west of Derby city centre. It is an upmarket housing area comprising modern housing, several public amenity parks, shops, a school and a nursery.

History
During its development in the 1990s the area was initially referred to as "Hollybrook", a more pleasant deviation on the name of Hell Brook, which runs through the area near Littleover Community School and through parts of the Heatherton estate.

The area is situated off the A5250, three miles south-west of Derby city centre, with easy access to Burton or Birmingham via the A38 and the M1 via the A50.

The majority of the Heatherton development is highly sought-after property, and has been popular among professional footballers. During Derby County's first stint in the Premiership, Heatherton was home to Fabrizio Ravanelli, other players who have lived there include Christian Dailly, Giles Barnes and Mart Poom.

Education
Griffe Field Primary School lies within the estate on Grosvenor Drive, built as a part of the initial development by Birch plc (since acquired by Edinburgh-based Miller Homes) but since expanded to double its original size early in the 2000s.

Community facilities
There is a small shopping arcade on Hollybrook Way, at the south-western entrance to the estate, across the road from the Haven Church, The Hollybrook pub and a Doctor's surgery. An Aldi supermarket was opened on a greenfield site adjacent to the Hollybrook pub in 2022.

Since the late 1990s, Heatherton has been served by a bus route operated by Trent Barton, known as "The Harlequin", which circles the estate and runs to a terminus on Gower Street in Derby City centre, every 20 minutes during the daytime from Monday to Saturday. An hourly evening and Sunday service is provided by the V3 Derby to Burton via Willington service which deviates through the estate at these times.

References

Areas of Derby